Grote Stirling,  (July 31, 1875 – January 18, 1953) was a Canadian politician.

Born in Tunbridge Wells, England, he was elected to the House of Commons of Canada representing the British Columbia riding of Yale in a 1924 by-election. A Conservative, he was re-elected in 1925, 1926, 1930, 1935, and 1940. From 1934 to 1935, he was the Minister of National Defence and Minister of Fisheries (Acting).

References

1875 births
1953 deaths
English emigrants to Canada
Conservative Party of Canada (1867–1942) MPs
Members of the House of Commons of Canada from British Columbia
Members of the King's Privy Council for Canada
Progressive Conservative Party of Canada MPs
People from Royal Tunbridge Wells